Yigoga is a genus of moths of the family Noctuidae, it was placed as a synonym of Dichagyris by Lafontain & Fibiger in 2003.

Selected former species
 Yigoga celsicola (Bellier, 1859)
 Yigoga fidelis (de Joannis, 1903)
 Yigoga flavina (Herrich-Schäffer, 1852)
 Yigoga forcipula (Denis & Schiffermüller, 1775)
 Yigoga gracilis (Wagner, 1929)
 Yigoga insula Fibiger, 1997
 Yigoga iranicola Koçak, 1980
 Yigoga libanicola (Corti & Draudt, 1933)
 Yigoga lutescens (Eversmann, 1844)
 Yigoga nachadira (Brandt, 1941)
 Yigoga nigrescens (Höfner, 1888)
 Yigoga orientis (Alphéraky, 1882)
 Yigoga romanovi (Christoph, 1885)
 Yigoga serraticornis (Staudinger, 1897)
 Yigoga signifera (Denis & Schiffermüller, 1775)
 Yigoga soror Fibiger, 1997
 Yigoga truculenta (Lederer, 1853)

References

Noctuinae